Assadecma madagascariensis is a species of beetle in the family Carabidae, the only species in the genus Assadecma.

References

Lebiinae